From their first match in 2006 to their final match in 2009, 37 players represented the Bermuda cricket team in One Day Internationals (ODIs). A One Day International is an international cricket match between two representative teams, each having ODI status, as determined by the International Cricket Council (ICC). An ODI differs from Test matches in that the number of overs per team is limited, and that each team has only one innings.

The Bermuda Cricket Board was formed in 1948, when the Somers Isles Cricket League amalgamated with the Bermuda Cricket Club to form the Bermuda Cricket Board. They were admitted to the ICC as an associate member in 1969, and in the 2005 ICC Trophy they gained One Day International status and qualified for the World Cup for the first time.  Bermuda played its first One Day International against Canada in May 2006.  In the 2007 World Cup, Bermuda struggled against the Test playing nations in their group and against India they recorded what remains the largest margin of defeat in a World Cup match, losing by 257 runs at Queen's Park Oval, Trinidad and Tobago.  Bermuda lost all their matches in the World Cup, which began a decline in Bermudian cricket and eventually led to them losing their ODI status during the 2009 World Cup Qualifier, in which they finished 9th.  Bermuda have not managed to regain this status and now play in World Cricket League Division Three, having also lost their first-class status they had held since 2004.

In total, Bermuda played 38 ODIs. Irving Romaine is the most capped player, having appeared in 35 matches and has scored more runs than any other Bermudian with 783. Dean Minors acted as wicket-keeper in twenty of the country's ODI fixtures.  Two individual century scores have been made by Bermudian batsman in ODIs, with Romaine and David Hemp making one each.  Hemp's score of 102 not out against Kenya in 2009 is the highest. Dwayne Leverock has claimed more wickets in ODI matches than any other Bermudian, having taken 34.  Three players have captained Bermuda in ODIs: Janeiro Tucker, Romaine and Dwight Basden.  Tucker captained the team in three matches in 2006, winning once and losing twice.  Romaine captained the team in 31 matches from 2006 to 2009, winning six and losing 25.  Basden captained the team in a single match against the Netherlands in 2007, which Bermuda lost.

This list includes all players who have played at least one ODI match and is initially arranged in the order of debut appearance. Where more than one player won their first cap in the same match, those players are initially listed alphabetically at the time of debut.

Key

Players
Statistics are correct as of the Bermuda's most recent ODI, against the Netherlands on 8 April 2009.

See also
One Day International
Bermuda national cricket team
List of Bermuda Twenty20 International cricketers

References

Bermuda ODI
ODI